Nevoga Arena is an indoor sporting arena located in Znojmo, Czech Republic, which is currently home to the Orli Znojmo ice hockey team of the 2nd Czech Republic Hockey league The arena has a capacity of 4,800 people and was built in 1970.

References

Indoor ice hockey venues in the Czech Republic
1970 establishments in Czechoslovakia
Sports venues completed in 1970
20th-century architecture in the Czech Republic